Andrew Jones (born 1835, date of death unknown) was a Union Navy sailor in the American Civil War and a recipient of the U.S. military's highest decoration, the Medal of Honor, for his actions at the Battle of Mobile Bay.

Born in 1835 in Limerick, Ireland, Jones immigrated to the United States and was living in New York when he joined the U.S. Navy. For this action, both Jones and Seanor were awarded the Medal of Honor four months later, on December 31, 1864.

Jones's official Medal of Honor citation reads:
Served as chief boatswain's mate on board the U.S. Ironclad Chickasaw, Mobile Bay, 5 August 1864. Although his enlistment was up, Jones volunteered for the battle of Mobile Bay, going on board the Chickasaw from the Vincennes where he then carried out his duties gallantly throughout the engagement with the enemy which resulted in the capture of the rebel ram Tennessee.

References 

1835 births
Year of death missing
Military personnel from Limerick (city)
Irish emigrants to the United States (before 1923)
People of New York (state) in the American Civil War
Union Navy sailors
United States Navy Medal of Honor recipients
Irish-born Medal of Honor recipients
American Civil War recipients of the Medal of Honor